Billy is the third album from American punk rock band Samiam, released in 1992 via New Red Archives.

Track listing

Personnel
David Ayer – drums
Jason Beebout – vocals
James Brogan – guitar
Martin Brohm – bass
Sergie Loobkoff – guitar

References

1992 albums
Samiam albums
New Red Archives albums